Hewlett Packard Enterprise Frontier, or OLCF-5, is the world's first and fastest exascale supercomputer, hosted at the Oak Ridge Leadership Computing Facility (OLCF) in Tennessee, United States and first operational in 2022. It is based on the Cray EX and is the successor to Summit (OLCF-4). , Frontier is the world's fastest supercomputer. Frontier achieved an Rmax of 1.102 exaFLOPS, which is 1.102 quintillion operations per second, using AMD CPUs and GPUs. Measured at 62.68 gigaflops/watt, Frontier topped the Green500 list for most efficient supercomputer, until it was dethroned by Flatiron Institute's Henri supercomputer in November 2022.

Design 
Frontier uses 9,472 AMD Epyc 7453s "Trento" 64 core 2 GHz CPUs (606,208 cores) and 37,888 Radeon Instinct MI250X GPUs (8,335,360 cores). They can perform double precision operations at the same speed as single precision.

"Trento" is an optimized 3rd Gen EPYC CPU ("Milan"), which itself is based on the Zen 3 microarchitecture.

It occupies 74  rack cabinets. Each cabinet hosts 64 blades, each consisting of 2 nodes.

Blades are interconnected by HPE Slingshot 64-port switch that provides 12.8 terabits/second of bandwidth. Groups of blades are linked in a dragonfly topology with at most three hops between any two nodes. Cabling is either optical or copper, customized to minimize cable length. Total cabling runs . Frontier is liquid-cooled, allowing 5x the density of air-cooled architectures.

Each node consists of one CPU, 4 GPUs and 5 terabytes of flash memory. Each GPU has 128 GB of RAM soldered onto it.

Frontier has coherent interconnects between CPUs and GPUs, allowing GPU memory to be accessed coherently by code running on the Epyc CPUs.

Frontier uses an internal 75 TB/s read / 35 TB/s write / 15 billion IOPS flash storage system, along with the 700 PB Orion site-wide Lustre filesystem.

Frontier consumes 21 megawatts (MW) (compared to its predecessor Summit's 13 MW); it has been estimated that the next US exascale system, Aurora, will consume around 60 MW.

History 
The original design envisioned hundreds of thousands of GPUs and 150–500 MW of power. Oak Ridge partnered with HPE Cray and AMD to build the system.

The machine was built at a cost of US$600 million. It began deployment in 2021 and reached full capability in 2022. It clocked 1.1 exaflops Rmax in May 2022, making it the world's fastest supercomputer as measured in the June 2022 edition of the TOP500 list, replacing Fugaku.

Upon its release, the supercomputer topped the Green500 list for most efficient supercomputer, measured at 62.68 gigaflops/watt. ORNL Director Thomas Zacharia said: "Frontier is ushering in a new era of exascale computing to solve the world’s biggest scientific challenges." He added: "This milestone offers just a preview of Frontier’s unmatched capability as a tool for scientific discovery. It is the result of more than a decade of collaboration among the national laboratories, academia and private industry, including DOE's Exascale Computing Project, which is deploying the applications, software technologies, hardware and integration necessary to ensure impact at the exascale."

References 

Cray products
Exascale computers
GPGPU supercomputers
Oak Ridge National Laboratory
X86 supercomputers
64-bit computers